This is the order of battle of Allied and German forces during Operation Dragoon in August 1944 in the South of France.

Allied land forces

Seventh Army
Lieutenant General Alexander Patch
 Detachment, Army HQ & HQ Company & Special Troops
 Detachment, HQ Seventh Army (For Beach Control HQ)

SPECIAL FORCES
 1st Airborne Task ForceBrigadier General Robert T. Frederick
 HQ & HQ Company, 1st Airborne Task Force
 517th Parachute Infantry Regiment
 1st Battalion 517th Parachute Infantry Regiment
 2nd Battalion 517th Parachute Infantry Regiment
 3rd Battalion 517th Parachute Infantry Regiment
 460th Parachute Field Artillery Battalion (HQ and four batteries of four 75mm pack howitzers)
 596th Airborne Engineer Company
 509th Parachute Infantry Battalion
 550th Airborne Infantry Battalion (Glider)
 1st Battalion, 551st Parachute Infantry Regiment (Reinforced)
 463rd Airborne Field Artillery Battalion
 602d Glider Field Artillery Battalion (75mm Pack)
 887th Airborne Engineer Aviation Company
 512th Airborne Signal Company
 Antitank Company, 442d Infantry Regiment*
 552nd Antitank Company* (The 552 Antitank Company was formed in July, 1944, in Rome, specifically for this operation. Since the 442nd became available while the 552nd was in training and took very little time to train on the British 6 lb. guns need for gliders, it went in first. But the 552nd was always on the complement of troops slated for this operation (and the 1st ABTF) and relieved the 442nd mid-October 1944 supporting the 1st ABTF member units still in the area. From documents from the National Archives.)
 Company A, 2d Chemical Mortar Battalion
 Company D (airborne), 83d Chemical Mortar Battalion
 676th Medical Collecting Company
 Provisional Airborne Military Police Platoon
 Provisional Pathfinder Detachment
 172d Detail Issues Depot British Heavy Aerial Resupply Company
 334th Quartermaster Depot Company(-)
 3358th Quartermaster Truck Company
 Detachment, 3d Ordnance Company (Medium Maintenance)
 British 2nd Independent Parachute Brigade Group
 4th Parachute Battalion
 5th (Scottish) Parachute Battalion
 6th (Royal Welch) Parachute Battalion
 127th (Parachute) Field Ambulance
 300th Airlanding Anti-tank Battery Royal Artillery
 64th Airlanding Battery Royal Artillery
 2nd Parachute Squadron Royal Engineers
 2nd Independent Parachute Brigade Group Signal Company Royal Signals
 1st Independent Glider Squadron Army Air Corps
 23rd Independent Platoon Army Air Corps (Pathfinders)
 2nd Independent Parachute Brigade Group Company Royal Army Service Corps
 751st Parachute Brigade Company Royal Army Service Corps
 T Company Royal Army Service Corps
 2nd Independent Parachute Brigade Group Workshop Royal Electrical and Mechanical Engineers
 2nd Independent Parachute Brigade Group Provost Section Royal Military Police
 US-Canadian 1st Special Service Force(-)(attached 22 August 1944 to replace the British 2nd Parachute Brigade; later assigned)
 French Groupe de Commandos (-)
 Commandos d'Afrique (750 men)
 Groupe Naval d'Assault de la Marine en Corse (67 men)

ENGINEER
 Company D (rem Map Plat), 378th Engineer Battalion (Separate)
 697th Engineer Petroleum Distribution Company
 Mobile Laboratory, 701st Engineer Petroleum Distribution Company
 Survey Platoon, 649th Engineer Topographic Battalion
 Company A, Engineer Camouflage Battalion
 1202nd Engineer Fire Fighting Platoon
 1204th Engineer Fire Fighting Platoon
 1711th Engineer Map Depot Detachment
 Special Platoon, 460th Engineer Depot Company

MILITARY POLICE
 204th Military Police Company
 372d Military Police Escort Guard Company
 377th Military Police Escort Guard Company (-3 Sections)
 504th Military Police Battalion (-2 Companies)
 HQ & HQ Detachment, 759th Military Police Battalion

MEDICAL
 1st Advance Section, 7th Medical Depot Company

QUARTERMASTER
 94th Quartermaster Railhead Company (-2 Platoons)
 138th Quartermaster Truck Company
 144th Quartermaster Truck Company
 Detachment, 202nd Quartermaster Car Company (-)
 HQ & HQ Detachment, 528th Quartermaster Battalion
 3357th Quartermaster Truck Company

SIGNAL
 Army Signal Battalion
 226th Signal Operation Company
 Detachment, 163rd Signal Photo Company
 982nd Signal Service Company

MISCELLANEOUS
 Detachment 72nd Liaison Squadron
 11th Postal Regulating Unit
 Special Service Staff (Office of Strategic Services)
 Twenty-eight Port Companies and Seven Battalion HQ Detachments.

VI Corps
Major General Lucian K. Truscott, Jr.
 HQ & HQ Company, VI Corps

COMBAT COMMAND
 Combat Command Sudre 1ere Division Blindee
 Attached:
 1ere Cie, 9e Regt Chasseurs d'Afrique
 Det, 661/2 Cie De Reparation Engines Blindee
 66e Cie de Munitions (-)
 Det, 705 Cie de Ravitaillement en Essence

FIELD ARTILLERY
 HQ & HQ Battery, VI Corps Artillery
 HQ & HQ Battery, 6th Field Artillery Group
 HQ & HQ Battery, 35th Field Artillery Group
 HQ & HQ Battery, 36th Field Artillery Group
 2nd Field Artillery Observation Battalion
 36th Field Artillery Battalion (155mm Gun)
 59th Field Artillery Battalion (105mm Howitzer SP)
 69th Field Artillery Battalion (105mm Howitzer SP)
 93rd Field Artillery Battalion (105mm Howitzer SP)
 141st Field Artillery Battalion (155mm Howitzer)
 634th Field Artillery Battalion (155mm Howitzer)
 937th Field Artillery Battalion (155mm Howitzer)
 938th Field Artillery Battalion (155mm Howitzer)
 976th Field Artillery Battalion (155mm Gun)
 977th Field Artillery Battalion (155mm Gun)

ANTIAIRCRAFT ARTILLERY
 HQ & HQ Battery, 35th Antiaircraft Artillery Brigade
 HQ & HQ Battery, 5th Antiaircraft Artillery Group
 HQ & HQ Battery, 68th Antiaircraft Artillery Group
 HQ & HQ Battery, 105th Antiaircraft Artillery Group
 68th Antiaircraft Artillery Gun Battalion (Mobile)
 72nd Antiaircraft Artillery Gun Battalion (Mobile)
 106th Antiaircraft Artillery (Automatic Weapons) Battalion (SP)
 107th Antiaircraft Artillery (Automatic Weapons) Battalion (Mobile)
 108th Antiaircraft Artillery Gun Battalion (Mobile)
 216th Antiaircraft Artillery Gun Battalion (Mobile)
 433rd Antiaircraft Artillery (Automatic Weapons) Battalion (Mobile)
 441st Antiaircraft Artillery (Automatic Weapons) Battalion (SP)
 443rd Antiaircraft Artillery (Automatic Weapons) Battalion (SP)
 451st Antiaircraft Artillery (Automatic Weapons) Battalion (Mobile)
 534th Antiaircraft Artillery (Automatic Weapons) Battalion (Mobile)
 895th Antiaircraft Artillery (Automatic Weapons) Battalion (Mobile)
 102nd Antiaircraft Artillery Barrage Balloon Battery (VLA)
 103rd Antiaircraft Artillery Barrage Balloon Battery (VLA)
 104th Antiaircraft Artillery Barrage Balloon Battery (VLA)

ARMOR
 191st Tank Battalion
 753rd Tank Battalion
 756th Tank Battalion

TANK DESTROYER
 601st Tank Destroyer Battalion
 636th Tank Destroyer Battalion
 645th Tank Destroyer Battalion 

CAVALRY
 117th Cavalry Reconnaissance Squadron

CHEMICAL WARFARE
 2nd Chemical Battalion Motorized (-1 Company)
 3rd Chemical Battalion Motorized
 83rd Chemical Battalion Motorized (-1 Company)
 6th Chemical Depot Company
 11th Chemical Maintenance Company
 21st Chemical Decontamination Company (-3 platoons) (Smoke Troops)

ENGINEER
 343rd Engineer General Service Regiment
 344th Engineer General Service Regiment
 Company C, (Bailey bridge), 378th Engineer Battalion (Separate)
 Company D, (Treadway Bridge), 378th Engineer Battalion (Separate)
 1st Platoon, 424th Engineer Dump Truck Company
 Contact Platoon, 469th Engineer Maintenance Company
 Survey Platoon, 661st Engineer Topographic Company
 6617th Engineer Mine Clearance Company

MILITARY POLICE
 206th Military Police Company

MEDICAL
 2nd Auxiliary Surgical Group
 14 General Surgical Teams
 3 Shock Teams
 1 Gas Team
 3 Orthopaedic Teams
 2 Thoracic Teams
 2 Neurosurgery Teams
 3 Dental Prosthetic Teams
 2 Maxillofacial Teams
 10th Field Hospital
 6703rd Blood Transfusion Unit
 11th Field Hospital
 11th Evacuation Hospital (Semimobile) (400 bed)
 93rd Evacuation Hospital (Semimobile) (400 bed)
 95th Evacuation Hospital (Semimobile) (400 bed)

ORDNANCE
 HQ & HQ Detachment, 43rd Ordnance Battalion
 HQ & HQ Detachment, 44th Ordnance Battalion
 HQ & HQ Detachment, 45th Ordnance Battalion
 14th Ordnance Medium Maintenance Company
 45th Ordnance Medium Maintenance Company
 46th Ordnance Medium Maintenance Company
 87th Ordnance Heavy Maintenance Company (Field Artillery)
 261st Ordnance Medium Maintenance Company (Anti Aircraft)
 3406th Ordnance Medium Automotive Maintenance Company
 3408th Ordnance Medium Automotive Maintenance Company
 3432nd Ordnance Medium Automotive Maintenance Company
 64th Ordnance Ammunition Company
 66th Ordnance Ammunition Company
 680th Ordnance Ammunition Company
 143rd Ordnance Bomb Disposal Squad
 144th Ordnance Bomb Disposal Squad
 145th Ordnance Bomb Disposal Squad
 146th Ordnance Bomb Disposal Squad

QUARTERMASTER
 46th Quartermaster Graves Registration Company (-1 Platoon)
 Platoon, 549th Quartermaster Laundry Company
 3426th Quartermaster Truck Company

SIGNAL
 1st Signal Center Team
 57th Signal Battalion
 3201 SIS Detachment
 4 Detachments, 163rd Signal Photo Company
 Detachment A, 117th Radio Intelligence Company

NAVAL
 3 Naval Combat Intelligence Teams
 Naval Gunfire Liaison Personnel
 15 Naval Shore Fire Control Parties

3rd Infantry Division
Major General John W. O'Daniel

ORGANIC UNITS
 HHC & Special Troops, 3rd Infantry Division
 3rd Military Police Platoon
 3rd Signal Company
 3rd Quartermaster Company
 3rd Counter Intelligence Corps Detachment
 3rd Mechanized Reconnaissance Troop
 703rd Ordnance Light Maintenance Company
 10th Engineer Combat Battalion
 3rd Medical Battalion
 7th Infantry Regiment
 15th Infantry Regiment
 30th Infantry Regiment
 HHB, 3rd Division Artillery
 9th Field Artillery Battalion (105mm Howitzer)
 10th Field Artillery Battalion (105mm Howitzer)
 39th Field Artillery Battalion (105mm Howitzer)
 41st Field Artillery Battalion (155mm Howitzer)

3RD INFANTRY DIVISION BEACH GROUP
 36th Engineer Combat Regiment
 1st Naval Beach Battalion
 72nd Signal Company (Special)
 Detachment, 207th Signal Depot Company
 Detachment, 177th Signal Repair Company
 HQ & HQ Detachment, 52nd Medical Battalion
 376th Medical Collecting Company
 377th Medical Collecting Company
 378th Medical Collecting Company
 682nd Medical Collecting Company
 1st Plat & HQ Detachment, 616th Medical Clearing Company
 Detachment, Boat Guards
 157th Military Police Prisoner of War Detachment
 706th Military Police Prisoner of War Detachment
 790th Military Police Prisoner of War Detachment
 Detachment, 377th Military Police Escort Guard Company
 Company A, 759th Military Police Battalion
 1st Platoon, 21st Chemical Decontamination Company (Smoke Troops)
 Detachment, 63rd Chemical Depot Company
 3rd Platoon, 450th Engineer Depot Company
 69th Ordnance Ammunition Company
 Detachment, 77th Ordnance Depot Company
 Detachment, 977th Ordnance Depot Company
 3407th Ordnance Medium Automotive Maintenance Company  (DUKW)
 6690th Regulating Company
 HQ & HQ Detachment, 530th Quartermaster Battalion
 4133rd Quartermaster Service Company
 4134th Quartermaster Service Company
 4135th Quartermaster Service Company
 4136th Quartermaster Service Company
 3277th Quartermaster Service Company
 3357th Quartermaster Truck Company
 3634th Quartermaster Truck Company
 HQ & HQ Detachment, 52nd Quartermaster Battalion (Mobile)
 3333rd Quartermaster Truck Company (DUKW)
 3334th Quartermaster Truck Company (DUKW)
 3325th Quartermaster Truck Company (DUKW)
 3336th Quartermaster Truck Company (DUKW)
 3353rd Quartermaster Truck Company (DUKW)
 3355th Quartermaster Truck Company (DUKW)
 Section, 3856th Quartermaster Gas Supply Company
 1 Platoon, 93rd Quartermaster Railhead Company
 332nd Air Force Beach Detail
 111th Beach Section, RAF

36th Infantry Division
Major General John E. Dahlquist

ORGANIC UNITS
 HHC & Special Troops, 36th Infantry Division
 36th Military Police Platoon
 36th Signal Company
 36th Quartermaster Company
 36th Counter Intelligence Corps Detachment
 36th Mechanized Reconnaissance Troop
 736th Ordnance Light Maintenance Company
 111th Engineer Combat Battalion
 111th Medical Battalion
 141st Infantry Regiment
 142nd Infantry Regiment
 143rd Infantry Regiment
 HHB, 36th Division Artillery
 131st Field Artillery Battalion (105mm Howitzer)
 132nd Field Artillery Battalion (105mm Howitzer)
 133rd Field Artillery Battalion (105mm Howitzer)
 155th Field Artillery Battalion (155mm Howitzer)

36TH INFANTRY DIVISION BEACH GROUP
 540th Engineer Combat Regiment
 48th Engineer Combat Battalion
 8th Naval Beach Battalion
 74th Signal Company (Special)
 Detachment, 207th Signal Depot Company
 Detachment, 177th Signal Repair Company
 HQ & HQ Detachment, 56th Medical Battalion
 885th Medical Collecting Company
 886th Medical Collecting Company
 887th Medical Collecting Company
 891st Medical Clearing Company
 1st Platoon, 638th Clearing Company
 Co. C, 759th Military Police Battalion
 1 Section, 377th Prisoner of War Escort Guard Company
 Detachment, Boat Guards
 192nd Provisional Military Police Prisoner of War Detachment
 601st Provisional Military Police Prisoner of War Detachment
 3rd Platoon, 21st Chemical Decontamination Company (Smoke Troops)
 Detachment, 63rd Chemical Depot Company
 1st Platoon, 450th Engineer Depot Company
 603rd Ordnance Ammunition Company
 Detachment, 77th Ordnance Depot Company
 Detachment, 977th Ordnance Depot Company
 3405th Ordnance Medium Automotive Maintenance Company (DUKW)
 Detachment, 6690th Regulating Company
 1 Section, 3894th Quartermaster Gas Supply Company
 2nd Platoon, 94th Quartermaster Railhead Co
 HQ & HQ Detachment, 53rd Quartermaster Battalion (Mobile)
 3337th Quartermaster Truck Company (DUKW)
 3338th Quartermaster Truck Company (DUKW)
 3339th Quartermaster Truck Company (DUKW)
 3340th Quartermaster Truck Company (DUKW)
 3354th Quartermaster Truck Company (DUKW)
 3356th Quartermaster Truck Company (DUKW)
 HQ & HQ Detachment, 259th Quartermaster Battalion
 3286th Quartermaster Service Company
 3287th Quartermaster Service Company
 3288th Quartermaster Service Company
 3289th Quartermaster Service Company
 3299th Quartermaster Service Company
 3300th Quartermaster Service Company
 3427th Quartermaster Truck Company
 3360th Quartermaster Truck Company
 Air Force Beach Detail
 111th Brick Section, RAF

45th Infantry Division
Major General William W. Eagles

ORGANIC UNITS
 HHC & Special Troops, 45th Infantry Division
 45th Military Police Platoon
 45th Signal Company
 45th Quartermaster Company
 45th Counter Intelligence Corps Detachment
 45th Mechanized Reconnaissance Troop
 700th Ordnance Light Maintenance Company
 120th Engineer Combat Battalion
 120th Medical Battalion
 157th Infantry Regiment
 179th Infantry Regiment
 180th Infantry Regiment
 HHB, 45th Division Artillery
 158th Field Artillery Battalion (105mm Howitzer)
 160th Field Artillery Battalion (105mm Howitzer)
 171st Field Artillery Battalion (105mm Howitzer)
 189th Field Artillery Battalion (155mm Howitzer)

45TH INFANTRY DIVISION BEACH GROUP
 40th Engineer Combat Regiment
 4th Naval Beach Battalion
 71st Signal Company (Special)
 Detachment, 207th Signal Depot Company
 Detachment, 177th Signal Repair Company
 HQ & HQ Detachment, 58th Medical Battalion
 388th Medical Collecting Company
 389th Medical Collecting Company
 390th Medical Collecting Company
 514th Medical Clearing Company
 2nd Platoon, 616th Clearing Company
 Company B, 759th Military Police Battalion
 1 Section, 377th Prisoner of War Escort Guard Company
 Detachment, Boat Guards
 133rd Provisional Prisoner of War Detachment
 175th Provisional Prisoner of War Detachment
 191st Provisional Prisoner of War Detachment
 3rd Platoon, 21st Chemical Decontamination Company (Smoke Troops)
 Detachment, 63rd Chemical Depot Company
 2nd Platoon, 450th Engineer Depot Company
 682nd Ordnance Ammunition Company
 Detachment, 77th Ordnance Depot Company
 Detachment, 977th Ordnance Depot Company
 3487th Ordnance Medium Automotive Maintenance Company (DUKW)
 3633rd Quartermaster Truck Company
 Detachment, 6690th Regulating Company
 HQ & HQ Detachment, 147th Quartermaster Battalion (Mobile)
 829th Amphibian Truck Company
 830th Amphibian Truck Company
 831st Amphibian Truck Company
 832nd Amphibian Truck Company
 1 Section, 3894th Quartermaster Gas Supply Company
 HQ & HQ Detachment, 240th Quartermaster Battalion
 3250th Quartermaster Service Company
 3251st Quartermaster Service Company
 3252nd Quartermaster Service Company
 3253rd Quartermaster Service Company
 4053rd Quartermaster Service Company
 Platoon, 94th Quartermaster Railhead Company
 3425th Quartermaster Truck Company
 Air Force Beach Detail
 110th Beach Section, RAF

Armee "B"
Général d'armée Jean de Lattre de Tassigny
 Etat-major de l'Armée "B", compagnie de quartier général 162/27 (-)

2ème Corps d'Armee
Général de corps d'armée Edgard de Larminat
 Etat-major du 2ème Corps d'Armée et compagnie de quartier général 75

Divisions
 1ère Division de Marche d'Infanterie - gen. Diego Brosset
 1ère Division Blindée (-2 CC) - gen. Jean Touzet du Vigier
 3ème Division d'Infanterie Algérienne - gen. Joseph de Goislard de Monsabert
 9ème Division d'Infanterie Coloniale - gen. Joseph Magnan
 2ème Régiment de Spahis Algériens (Reconnaissance Battalion)
 1er Groupe de Tabors Marocains
 3ème Groupe de Tabors Marocains
 4ème Groupe de Tabors Marocains

FIELD ARTILLERY
 Etat-major du Groupement d'artillerie
 No. 1 Detachment, 1st Field Artillery Observation Battalion (US)
 1er groupe du Régiment d'Artillerie Coloniale du Levant
 3ème groupe du 65e Régiment d'Artillerie

Anti Aircraft Artillery
 Detachment, HQ & HQ Battery, 34th AAA Brigade (US)
 62nd AAA Gun Battalion (US)
 Detachment, HQ & HQ Battery, 80th AAA Group (US)
 893rd AAA (AW) Battalion (SM)

Tank Destroyer
 Chasseurs d'Afrique
 7ème Régiment de Chasseurs d'Afrique
 8ème Régiment de Chasseurs d'Afrique

Engineer
 Compagnie Topographique du Génie No. 31
 101ème Régiment du Génie

MILITARY POLICE
 521ème Regulatrice Routiere
 2e compagnie du 11e groupe de la Garde

MEDICAL
 401ème Hôpital d'Evacuation Organe de Réanimation et de Transfusion No. 441/3
 405ème Hôpital d'Evacuation
 432ème Bataillion Médical
 451/1 Depot Avancé
 422e Hôpital de Campagne

ORDNANCE
 Etat-major du 651ème Bataillon de Réparation
 Compagnie Moyenne de Réparation du Materiel No. 652/1
 Compagnie Moyenne de Réparation Automobile No. 651/3
 Compagnie Moyenne de Réparation Automobile No. 652/3
 64e Compagnie de Munitions
 65e Compagnie de Munitions

QUARTERMASTER
 1er bataillon du 8ème Régiment de Tirailleurs Sénégalais, Pioniers
 Gestion de Subsistance d'Etapes No. 323
 Gestion de Subsistance d'Etapes No. 325
 Compagnie Mixte de Ravitaillement en Essence No. 704 (2 detachments)

SIGNAL
 61ème Bataillon de Transmissions de Corps d'Armée
 6693rd Signal Detachment (Provisional) (US)
 3 Detachments, 163rd Signal Photo Company (US)
 806ème Bataillon de Construction
 Detachment, Trans Armée "B"
 Compagnie d' Exploitation 827/1
 Station d'Ecoutes 828
 Groupe de télégraphie militaire 829
 Détachement du Parc de Transmissions No. 810 & Détachement de la Compagnie Technique de Transmissions No. 841

Transportation
 11ème compagnie du Groupe de Transport No. 501

Allied air forces

Mediterranean Allied Tactical Air Force
Major General John K. Cannon

XII Tactical Air Command
Brigadier General Gordon P. Saville
 1st Fighter Group  (Lockheed P-38 Lightning) (on loan to MATAF 12–20 August 1944)
 14th Fighter Group (P-38 Lightning) (on loan to MATAF 12–20 August 1944)
 27th Fighter Group (Republic P-47 Thunderbolt)
 57th Fighter Group (P-47 Thunderbolt)
 79th Fighter Group (P-47 Thunderbolt)
 86th Fighter Group (P-47 Thunderbolt)
 324th Fighter Group (P-47 Thunderbolt)
 No. 251 Wing RAF (Supermarine Spitfire IX)
 No. 322 Wing RAF (Supermarine Spitfire IX)
 No. 324 Wing RAF (Supermarine Spitfire IX)
 47th Bombardment Group (Douglas A-20 Havoc)
 111th Reconnaissance Squadron (F-6A Mustang)
 415th Night Fighter Squadron (Beaufighter VI)
 No. 225 Squadron RAF (Spitfire V)
 II/33 Escadrille (Spitfire V)
 Quartieme Escadre (P-47 Thunderbolt)
 57th Bombardment Wing
 310th Bombardment Group (North American B-25 Mitchell)
 321st Bombardment Group (B-25 Mitchell)
 340th Bombardment Group (B-25 Mitchell)
 5th Photographic Reconnaissance Squadron (F-5 Lightning)
 23d Photographic Reconnaissance Squadron (F-5 Lightning)
 No. 682 Squadron RAF (Supermarine Spitfire XI)
 42d Bombardment Wing
 17th Bombardment Group Martin B-26 Marauder
 319th Bombardment Group (B-26 Marauder)
 320th Bombardment Group (B-26 Marauder)
 31e Escadre (B-26 Marauder)
 31st Fighter Group P-51 Mustang (Escorts for airborne operations)
 325th Fighter Group P-51 Mustang (Escorts for airborne operations)

Source: Jackson (1986), p. 221

Mediterranean Allied Coastal Air Force
Air Vice-Marshal Hugh Lloyd

63rd Fighter Wing
 No. 326 (GC 2/7 Nice) (Spitfire V and IX)
 No. 327 (GC 1/3 Corse) (Spitfire IX)
 No. 328 (GC 1/7 Provence) (Spitfire V and IX)
 417th Night Fighter Squadron (Beaufighter VI)
 VOC-01 (Grumman F6F Hellcat, Grumman TBF Avenger)
 350th Fighter Group
 345th Fighter Squadron (Bell P-39 Airacobra)
 346th Fighter Squadron (P-39 Airacobra)
 347th Fighter Squadron (P-39 Airacobra)
 No. 272 Squadron RAF (Beaufighter X)
 414th Night Fighter Squadron (Beaufighter VI)
 No. 256 Squadron RAF (Mosquito XII and XIII)
 No. 153 Squadron RAF (Beaufighter VI)
 No. 458 Squadron RAAF (Wellington XIV)
 No. 36 Squadron RAF  (Wellington XIV)
 No. 17 Squadron SAAF (Lockheed Ventura V)
 4S Squadron  (Supermarine Walrus)
 No. 14 Squadron RAF (Marauder I, II and III)

Source: Jackson (1986), p. 222

Provisional Troop Carrier Air Division
Brigadier General Paul L. Williams
 50th Troop Carrier Wing (C-47 Skytrain)
 439th Troop Carrier Group
 440th Troop Carrier Group
 441st Troop Carrier Group
 442d Troop Carrier Group
 51st Troop Carrier Wing (C-47 Skytrain)
 60th Troop Carrier Group
 62nd Troop Carrier Group
 64th Troop Carrier Group
 53rd Troop Carrier Wing (C-47 Skytrain)
 435th Troop Carrier Group
 436th Troop Carrier Group
 437th Troop Carrier Group
 438th Troop Carrier Group

Source: Warren, p. 87

Allied naval forces
Vice Admiral Henry Kent Hewitt

CONTROL FORCE, Vice Admiral Hewitt

SPECIAL OPERATIONS GROUP Captain H. C. Johnson
 Western Diversionary Unit, Captain H. C. Johnson
 , four Minelayers, eight 8 PT boats, twelve ASRC
 Eastern Diversionary Unit, Lieutenant Commander Douglas Fairbanks, Jr.

Task Force 84 "Alpha Force"
Rear Admiral Frank J. Lowry
 Force Flagship Group: , Fighter Director Ship , LCl-953, PC-1169.
 Assault Groups
 Red Beach Assault Group: 46 LCI, 25 LST, 7 LCC, 43 LCT, 11 LCM, 1 LCG, 1 LCF, 7 LCS, 4 British AM, 5 PC
 Gunfire Support Group, Rear Admiral J. M. Mansfield RN
 Battleship 
 Heavy cruiser 
 Minesweeper Group
 Salvage and firefighting group
 Fleet tug , 1 ATA, British tugs Empire Spitfire, Empire Ann, 1 boom vessel, 1 ATR, 1 YTB, 1 YTL, 1 FT

Task Force 85 "Delta Force"
Rear Admiral Bertram J. Rodgers
 Force Flagship Group:
 Seaplane tender 
 Destroyer 
 one fighter-director tender
 TRANSPORT GROUPCaptain R. A. Dierdorff
 Attack freighters  , 
 British LSP Dilwara, LSI , Landing Ship Gantry Ennerdale (converted tanker carrying LCM).
 Destroyer escorts , 
 ASSAULT GROUPS
 Red Beach Assault Group: 10 LST, 6 LCI, 7 LCT, 1 LCG, I LCF, 4 LCS, 2 LCM(R), 2 SC, 2 LCC; 1 LCM
 Green Beach Assault Group: 5 LST, 5 LCI, 7 LCT, 4 LCS, 2 LCM, 2 SC, 1 LCC
 Yellow Beach Assault Group: 2 LST, 2 LCI, 26 LCVP, 4 LCS, 4 LCT, 3 LCM, 1 SC, 1 LCC
 Blue Beach Assault Group: 1 LST, 26 LCVP, 16 LCT, 1 LCG, 1 LCF, 4 LCS, 3 LCM, 1 PC, 1 LCC, 1 LCI
 Corps and Division Reserve Groups: 5 LST, 20 LCI, 18 LCT, I FT
 GUNFIRE SUPPORT GROUPRear Admiral C. F. Bryant
 Battleships , 
 Light cruiser 
 French light cruisers , 
 MINESWEEPER GROUP
 Danlayers Satsa, Calm
 COMBAT AND FIREFIGHTING GROUP

Task Force 87 CAMEL FORCE
Rear Admiral Spencer S. Lewis
 Force Flagship Group: Attack transport , British LCH-3l5·
 ASSAULT GROUPS
 Red Beach Assault Group:
 Attack transports , 
 5 LCI, 3 LST, 21 LCT, 20 LCVP, 9 LCS, 3 LCC, 1 LCG, 1 LCF, 2 LCM, 3 SC, 2 PC; 1 LSI (Br.), 1 LSD (Br.)
 Green Beach Assault Group: 23 LCI, I LCH, 14 LST, 21 LCT, 7 LCVP, 7 LCS, 3 LCC, 1 LCG, 1 LCF, 2 LCM, 2 PC, 2 SC
 Blue Beach Assault Group: 5 LST, 1 LCI, 3 LCS, 2 LCT, 2 SC, 1 PC
 Escort and Screening Group: Destroyers from Bombardment Group; 6 PC, 10 SC, 1 LST, 2 LCF, 1 LSF, 1 LCC, 5 LCS, 5 LCVP, 1 LCT, 2 LCM
 BOMBARDMENT GROUPRear Admiral Morton L. Deyo
 Battleship 
 Heavy Cruiser 
 Minesweeper Group
 Salvage and Firefighting Group

Task Force 86 SITKA FORCE
Rear Admiral Lyal A. Davidson
 GUNFIRE SUPPORT GROUPRear Admiral Davidson
 
 Heavy cruiser  (flagship)
 Light cruiser 
 TRANSPORT GROUPRear Admiral Theodore E. Chandler
 Unit A: Destroyer transports , HMS Prince Baudoin; PT-201
 Screen: Eight PT boats 
 MINESWEEPER GROUP

Task Force 88 AIRCRAFT CARRIER FORCE

Rear Admiral Thomas Hope Troubridge RN

TG 88.1
Rear Admiral T.H. Troubridge RN
  (899 Naval Air Squadron) Supermarine Seafire
  (800 Naval Air Squadron) Grumman Hellcat
  (882 Naval Air Squadron) Grumman Wildcat
  (881 Naval Air Squadron) Wildcat
  (879 Naval Air Squadron) Supermarine Seafire
 Anti-aircraft light cruisers  (flagship),

TG 88.2
Rear Admiral Calvin T. Durgin USN
  (VOF-01) F6F Hellcat,
  (VF-74) F6F Hellcat,
  (807 Naval Air Squadron) Supermarine Seafire,
  (809 Naval Air Squadron) Supermarine Seafire
 Antiaircraft light cruisers , 

TG 80.6 Antisubmarine and Convoy Control Group
Captain J. P. Clay
 French destroyers Le Fortuné , Forbin , Simoun, Tempête, Alcyon
 French corvettes Marocain, Tunisien , Hova, Algérien, Somali
 French sloops Commandant Domine, La Moqueuse, Commandant Bory, La Gracieuse, Commandant Delage, La Boudeuse
 Corvettes , 

Source: Morison,  The Invasion of France and Germany, 1944–1945 (1957), pp. 338–343

German land forces

Army Group G
Generaloberst Johannes Blaskowitz

Nineteenth Army
General der Infanterie Friedrich Wiese

IV Luftwaffe Field Corps
 716th Infantry Division
 198th Infantry Division
 189th Infantry Division

LXXXV Army Corps
General der Infanterie Baptist Knieß
 338th Infantry DivisionGeneralleutnant René l'Homme de Courbiére
 244th Infantry DivisionGeneralleutnant Hans Schaefer

LXII Army Corps
General der Infanterie Ferdinand Neuling
 242nd Infantry DivisionGeneralleutnant Johannes Baessler
 148th Reserve DivisionGeneralmajor Otto Fretter-Pico

LXIV Army Corps 
The Corps swapped units with the IV Luftwaffe Corps in September.
 159th Reserve Division

Army Reserve
 11th Panzer DivisionGeneralmajor Wend von Wietersheim
 157th Reserve Division
 158th Reserve Division (was in transition forming the 16th Infantry Division)

German air forces

Luftflotte 2
2. Flieger-Division

German naval forces

Kommandierender Admiral der französische Südküste
6. Sicherungsflotille

Notes

References

 
 
 
 
 
 

Operation Dragoon
World War II orders of battle